Sequential high-dose chemotherapy is a chemotherapy regimen consisting of several (2 to 4) sequential monochemotherapies with only one chemotherapeutic agent per course. The idea behind this approach is that when using single-agent chemotherapy, the doctor can easily escalate the dose of the drug to the maximum tolerable dose by the patient, avoiding additive hematological toxicity from chemotherapeutic combinations, and thus improving efficacy. It is mostly used as consolidation therapy for relapsed or refractory lymphomas and relapsed or refractory Hodgkin disease, after DHAP induction. There is also an ongoing trial of this approach in multiple myeloma.


Dosing regimen 

Depending on the patient's performance status, his/her ability to tolerate chemotherapy, the type of lymphoma, the stage of disease and different prognostic factors, one or more courses of the full sequence can be omitted or dose reduced.
After completion of the sequence, the patient will usually undergo pre-transplant conditioning chemotherapy regimen (such as BEAM) and then will get autologous stem cell transplantation as the final consolidation.

References 

Chemotherapy regimens used in lymphoma
Chemotherapy regimens used in multiple myeloma